The 2016 Uzbek League was the 25th season of top-level football in Uzbekistan since 1992. Pakhtakor were the defending champions from the 2015 campaign.

Teams

Sogdiana Jizzakh remained for 2016 Uzbek League after winning in relegation play-off match with Oqtepa. Obod Tashkent promoted to 2016 League as 2015 First League winner. The draw of 2016 season was held on 22 December 2015. The first matchday is scheduled for 4 March 2016.

Managerial changes

Foreign players

The number of foreign players is restricted to five per USL team. A team can use only five foreign players on the field in each game.

League table

Relegation play-off
The one leg relegation play-off match between 15th placed team of Uzbek League, Navbahor Namangan and runners-up of 2016 Uzbekistan First League, FC Naryn Khakkulabad was played on 28 November 2016 in Tashkent. Navbahor won by 3:1 and remained in League.

Season statistics

Top goalscorers

Hat–tricks

Awards

Monthly awards

References

External links
Uzbekistan PFL - Official League Site 

Uzbekistan Super League seasons
1
Uzbek
Uzbek